Locomotive classes used by the broad gauge South Devon Railway, later amalgamated with the Great Western Railway.

References